HMS Dido was an 18-gun  built for the Royal Navy during the 1830s.

Description
The ship's tonnage was 734  tons burthen. The Daphne class was armed with eighteen 32-pounder cannon. The ships had a crew of 145 officers and ratings that later increased to 175.

Construction and career
Dido, the second ship of her name to serve in the Royal Navy, was ordered on 26 February 1834, Designed by Symonds, laid down in September 1834 at Pembroke Dockyard, Wales, and launched on 13 June 1836. She was completed on 26 January 1837 at Sheerness Dockyard and commissioned on 25 October 1836.

In May 1843 Didos crew were manning the proa Jolly Batchelor, which belonged to Rajah Brooke of Sarawak, when they were attacked by two Lanoon pirate proas off Datto Point, Borneo at 3 am. The encounter ended in the destruction of one proa and the elimination of the crew of the other.

Dido  arrived at Auckland, New Zealand from the East Indies Station on 2 June 1847.

She took part in Syrian war of 1840 and Chinese war of 1842. On 9 April 1852, she ran aground on the Wellsbank, off Callao, Peru. On 28 July 1852, she ran aground off Tahiti, damaging her forefoot and keel. She was ordered back to England for repairs. In Pacific 1855. She was used as a coal hulk after 1860, at Sheerness and was sold in 1903.

Notes

References

External links
 

 

Daphne-class corvette
1836 ships
Ships built in Pembroke Dock
Maritime incidents in May 1852
Maritime incidents in July 1852